Clarence Fok Yiu-leung (霍耀良) is a Hong Kong film director and actor from Ottawa, Ontario, Canada. He is perhaps best known for directing the international cult classic Naked Killer (1992).

He was once asked by producer Mario Kassar to direct Basic Instinct 2.

Awards

Fok was nominated as Best Supporting Actor at the 1986 Hong Kong Film Awards for his performance in Let's Make Laugh II (1985).

Filmography

As director

 Special ID (2013)
 Dating a Vampire in Bed (2006)
 Don't Open Your Eyes (2006)
 Martial Angels (2001) (as Clarence Ford)
 Snakeheads (2001)
 Queen of Kowloon (2000)
 Don't Look Back... Or You'll Be Sorry in Bed (2000) (as Clarence Ford)
 Century of the Dragon (1999)
 The H.K. Triad (1999)
 Her Name Is Cat (1998) (as Clarence Ford)
 Cheap Killers (1998)
 On Fire (1996)
 Thunder Cop (1996)
 Passion (1995)
 The Black Panther Warriors (1993) (as Clarence Ford)
 Remains of a Woman (1993)
 Naked Killer (1992)
 Gun n' Rose (1992)
 Crying Freeman: Dragon from Russia (1990)
 Chicken à la Queen (1990)
 The Iceman Cometh (1989)
 They Came to Rob Hong Kong (1989)
 The Greatest Lover (1988)
 Before Dawn (1984)
 Wrong Wedding Trail (1984)
 On the Wrong Track (1983)
 Job Hunter (1981)

As actor
 Body Weapon (1999)
 Project A, Part II (1987) (as Clarence Fok)
 Enchanting Night (1987)
 Armour of God (1987) - Singer
 Let's Make Laugh II (1985)
 Police Story (1985)

References

External links
 

Year of birth missing (living people)
Hong Kong film directors
Hong Kong male actors
Living people
Film directors from Ottawa
Male actors from Ottawa
Asian-Canadian filmmakers